Out of Love is the debut studio album of indie rock supergroup Mister Heavenly. It was released on August 16, 2011 on the record label Sub Pop.

Track listing

References 

Mister Heavenly albums
2011 albums